The Aldershot narrow-gauge suspension railway was built in 1872 as an innovative experimental railway at Aldershot Camp, Hampshire, England.

History 

The whole railway consisted of a continuous structure, formed of wood or iron. A single row of pillars stood at regular intervals along the line; the lower ends of the pillars rested upon wooden sleepers, and were steadied by transverse diagonal struts. Holes were dug in the ground, the pillars placed in position, and the earth well rammed down. The length of the pillar varied according to the contour of the ground, for their upper ends must range with each other, so as to carry the superstructure; this was formed by two longitudinal beams of wood (or iron) placed side by side, with a space between them, bolted to, strutted from, and supported by the pillars.

They were peculiar to this system, and acted as guides for the horizontal wheels of the waggons and carriages. Where sidings occurred, or shunting was required, the switches were formed by making a  length of the railway to point on one end, while the other end was resting on a pair of rollers, traveled from the main line to and from the siding.

All the details appear to have been carefully considered, and, if the result were as satisfactory as anticipated, it was intended to make several miles of this railway in and about the camps at Aldershot, and in leisure times the soldiers could be exercised in taking them down and putting it up again for military transport service." The experiments referred to formed one of a series which have been held at Aldershot during the last three months of 1872, and the result fully justified all that its inventor has stated respecting the scheme. The lines made on this principle are capable of carrying sufficient quantities of military stores, including field artillery and siege guns of 7-tons weight.

Passenger trains were run over the line at a speed of twenty miles an hour (32 km/h), mixed trains at a speed of fifteen miles an hour (24 km/h) and goods trains at a speed of ten miles an hour (16 km/h). The maximum speed attained with a passengers only train was thirty miles an hour (48 km/h), and the carriages ran as smoothly as those of a standard-gauge railway. There was no perceptible oscillation of the structure, and the vibration was no more than it was usual with contemporary iron and timber railway bridges.

Track 

The track was laid down between the Field Stores Depot and the Barrack Stores. The line was upwards of one mile in length.

Rolling stock

Locomotive 

Manning, Wardle & Co. of the Boyne Engine Works, Leeds designed and built a special locomotive for its operation. It had to meet military as well as other requirements. The general plan of the structure of the locomotive has been designed by J.B. Fell, but the working plans were prepared and the engine built by Manning, Wardle & Co, Leeds. The engine weighed 4½ tons, and the tender 3½ tons, with coal and water. There were three pairs of driving-wheels coupled, each  in diameter. There were also four horizontal wheels running upon guide rails fixed on the lower edges of the beams.

Wagons 
The waggons suspended from two pairs of wheels placed not under the body but at each end of it, the body of the wagon was thus brought down to about
 above the carrying rails, and a very low centre of gravity is by this means obtained. They were suspended below the axles, by which arrangement the centre of gravity was brought very low, and they were furnished with horizontal wheels running against the guide rails, whereby the equilibrium of the carriage to leave was maintained and it was rendered almost impossible for it to leave the rails.

Further Literature 
 E.A. Wade: The patent narrow gauge railways of John Barraclough Fell. N.G.R.S., HUDDERSFIELD, 1986.

See also 
 Yarlside Iron Mines tramway
 Lartigue Monorail

References 

Monorails in the United Kingdom
18 in gauge railways in England
Aldershot Garrison
Defunct monorails
Rail transport in Hampshire